The Manti Utah Temple (formerly the Manti Temple) is the fifth constructed temple of the Church of Jesus Christ of Latter-day Saints. Located in the city of Manti, Utah, it was the third Latter-day Saint temple built west of the Mississippi River, after the Mormons' trek westward. (The St. George and Logan Utah temples preceded it.) The Manti Temple was designed by William Harrison Folsom, who moved to Manti while the temple was under construction. The temple dominates the Sanpete Valley, and can be seen from many miles. Like all Latter-day Saint temples, only church members in good standing may enter.  It is one of only two remaining Latter-day Saint temples in the world where live actors are used in the endowment ceremonies (the other is the Salt Lake Temple); all other temples use films in the presentation of the endowment, a practice that will end following renovations announced in 2021.  It is an early pioneering example of  four rooms representing the journey of life.

History
Brigham Young announced the decision to build a temple in Manti on June 25, 1875, and dedicated the site on April 25, 1877. On the day of the dedication, Young took Warren S. Snow to the southeast corner of the temple site and told him, "Here is the spot where the Prophet Moroni stood and dedicated this piece of land for a Temple site, and that is the reason why the location is made here, and we can't move it from this spot."

The Salt Lake Temple had been announced in 1847, but construction was still underway and not finished until 1893. The Manti Temple was built, along with the St. George and Logan temples, to satisfy the church's immediate need for these structures. The site for the temple was the Manti Stone Quarry, a large hill immediately northeast of town. Early Mormon settlers in the area had prophesied that this would be the site of a temple. When Young announced the building of the temple, he also announced that the  plot would then be known as "Temple Hill."

The temple was completed in 1888, and a private dedication was held on May 17, 1888, with a prayer written by Wilford Woodruff. Three public dedications were held on May 21–23, 1888, and were directed by Lorenzo Snow.

The Manti Temple was the location of the Holy of Holies until the Salt Lake Temple was dedicated. The room was then used for sealings until it was closed in the late 1970s.

A 1966 study found that 52 percent of temple work was being done in either the Salt Lake, Logan, or Manti temples, even though there were 13 operating temples by that time. This led to the building of the Ogden and Provo temples to relieve the strain on the older pioneer-era temples.

Art

The temple includes murals by important Latter-day Saint artists, including C. C. A. Christensen (Creation Room, 1886–87), Minerva Teichert (World Room, 1947, assisted by Frank Stevens), Robert L. Shepherd (Garden Room, 1946) John Hafen, J. B. Fairbanks, and Dan Weggeland. Some of the original murals, having been damaged and unable to be saved, had sail canvas placed over them in order for new murals to be painted. For instance, Weggeland's Garden Room mural still exists underneath Shepherd's.

The temple is also filled with other paintings. The mix of paintings has changed over time, but among the painting originally intended for the building include two by Christensen, one depicting the hill upon which the temple would later sit with a Native American encampment in the foreground, the other depicting the temple itself and its landscaped grounds.

Renovations
The Manti Temple has undergone various remodeling and renovations. Construction of a great stone stairway leading up the hill to the west temple doors began in 1907. In 1935, the temple was fully lit at night for the first time. In 1940 the stone stairs were removed and work began to beautify the grounds. Between 1944 and 1945 the annex, chapel, kitchen, Garden Room, and men's and women's areas were remodeled. There was once a tunnel beneath the east tower of the temple through which wagons and cars could pass, but it was closed off in the 1960s.

In 1981, church officials decided that the interior of the temple needed extensive remodeling. The renovation took four years, during which murals and original furniture were restored, offices were enlarged and remodeled, a separate door was made to the baptistry, water and weather damage were repaired, an elevator installed, and locker rooms were improved among many other projects. In June 1985, Gordon B. Hinckley directed the rededication ceremonies. Exterior preservation efforts have also occurred since that time.

Removal of murals
In March 2021, the First Presidency announced significant renovations for the Manti and Salt Lake temples, including ending the live endowment. The decision to end live endowments was rooted in the need for the temples to offer more sessions throughout the day and in different languages; live endowment sessions were only available in English in either temple. To accommodate these changes, it was announced the interiors of the temples would be reconfigured for single-room, multimedia-based endowment sessions as done in other temples, which would also involve the removal of historic artwork in the temples, including Minerva Teichert's murals in the Manti temple. A week following the initial announcement, the church issued an updated statement on the plans for the Manti Temple, stating it would consult with art preservationists about the best way to remove part or all of the Teichert murals, which are canvas affixed to plaster, and preserve them for public display.

On May 1, Russell M. Nelson announced that upon reconsideration that, although the temple would be updated to use film, care would be taken to preserve the temple's interior, including its art. To increase temple capacity for the area, an additional temple will be built in Ephraim, Utah.

Style
The Manti Temple combines the Gothic Revival, French Renaissance Revival, Second French Empire, and Colonial architectural styles. The temple has  of floor space, eight sealing rooms, four ordinance rooms, and a Celestial room. The exterior is made of fine-textured, cream-colored oolite limestone from quarries in the hill on which the temple now stands.

Temple presidents
Notable temple presidents have included: Daniel H. Wells (1888–91); Anthon H. Lund (1891–93); John D. T. McAllister (1893–1906); Robert D. Young (1933–43); Jack H. Goaslind Jr. (2000–03); and Ed J. Pinegar (2009–12). Douglas M. Dyreng has been the temple president since 2018.

See also

 The Church of Jesus Christ of Latter-day Saints in Utah
 Comparison of temples of The Church of Jesus Christ of Latter-day Saints
 List of temples of The Church of Jesus Christ of Latter-day Saints
 List of temples of The Church of Jesus Christ of Latter-day Saints by geographic region
 Mormon Miracle Pageant
 Temple architecture (Latter-day Saints)

Notes

Further reading

External links

 Manti Utah Temple Official site
 Manti Utah Temple at ChurchofJesusChristTemples.org
 

19th-century Latter Day Saint temples
Buildings and structures in Sanpete County, Utah
Churches on the National Register of Historic Places in Utah
Churches completed in 1888
Temples (LDS Church) in Utah
1888 establishments in Utah Territory
Historic American Buildings Survey in Utah
National Register of Historic Places in Sanpete County, Utah
Manti, Utah